Claudia Brokof (born 20 05 1977) is a former German female canoeist who won at senior level the Wildwater Canoeing World Championships in 1998 in Garmisch-Partenkirchen.

In 1996 she won the third place at senior level the Wildwater Canoeing World Champhionships in Landeck, Austria.

In 1999 she received the award of the silver bay leaf from federal minister of the interior Otto Schily.

References

External links
 Rosenheim (Stadt)

1966 births
Living people
German female canoeists
People from Rosenheim
Sportspeople from Upper Bavaria